Khryukin (from хрюкать meaning to grunt) is a Russian masculine surname, its feminine counterpart is Khryukina. It may refer to
Mikhail Khryukin (born 1955), Russian swimmer 
Timofey Khryukin (1910–1953), Soviet aviator

Russian-language surnames